The Employment and Training Act 1948 was an Act of Parliament passed in the United Kingdom by the Labour government of Clement Attlee. This legislation became the legal foundation for the post-war employment service under the Ministry of Labour. Every worker (regardless of whether he or she was in employment) was encouraged to register if he or she wanted a new job. It also established a Youth Employment Service to help find work opportunities for school-leavers. Under the Act, as noted by David Peck, the Minister of Labour and National Service was to provide:
“Such facilities and services as he considers expedient for the purpose of assisting persons to select, fit themselves for, obtain and retain employment suitable to their age and capacity, of assisting employers to obtain suitable employees, and generally for the purpose of promoting employment in accordance with the requirements of the community.”

Notes

Career development in the United Kingdom
United Kingdom Acts of Parliament 1948
Youth employment